A list of films produced by the Tollywood (Bengali language film industry) based in Kolkata in the year 2000.

Highest-grossing
 Sasurbari Zindabad

A-Z of films

References

External links
 Tollywood films of 2000 at the Internet Movie Database

2000
Bengali
 Bengali
2000 in Indian cinema